Anne Halkivaha (born 9 February 1986 in Oripää) is a Finnish race walker. She competed in the 20 km event at the 2012 Summer Olympics in London, finishing in 54th place.

References

1986 births
Living people
People from Oripää
Finnish female racewalkers
Athletes (track and field) at the 2012 Summer Olympics
Olympic athletes of Finland
Sportspeople from Southwest Finland